Duolun County (Mongolian:   Dolonnuur siyan) is a county of Inner Mongolia, People's Republic of China. It is under the administration of Xilin Gol League.

Climate
Duolun County has a dry, monsoon-influenced humid continental climate (Köppen Dwb), with bitterly cold and very dry winters, warm, humid summers, and strong winds, especially in spring. With monthly percent possible sunshine ranging from 56% in July to 77% in January and February, sunshine is abundant year-round, with 3,036 hours of bright sunshine annually.

The desertification in early 2000s has been largely checked by the effort of reforestation.

Historic sites
The Chinese state news agency Xinhua announced in January 2018 the discovery of ruins of an ancient palace that served as the summer retreat for the elite in the Liao Dynasty. The royal family and retinue would relocate each year from mid-April to mid-July to avoid the heat. More than 100 structural components at the site have been found and the foundations of 12 buildings have been recorded. Artifacts found include: glazed tiles, pottery and copper nails. Ge Zhiyong, a researcher with the Inner Mongolia Autonomous Region Institute of Archaeology, date the artifacts to the mid-Liao Dynasty. The dynasty was the first of many dynasties of nomadic origin to merge its nomadic structure and culture with the Chinese style of government.

References

www.xzqh.org 

County-level divisions of Inner Mongolia